Oakdale is a semi-rural suburb or district in Wollondilly Shire in Sydney's southwest in New South Wales, Australia.

Notes and references

Towns in the Macarthur (New South Wales)
Wollondilly Shire